The Face Reader (lit. "Physiognomy") is a 2013 South Korean film starring Song Kang-ho as the son of a disgraced noble family who goes around Joseon and a gwansang expert. He is able to assess the personality, mental state and habits of a person by looking at his or her face. His talents bring him to the royal courts where he becomes involved in a power struggle between Grand Prince Suyang and general Kim Jong-seo, a high-ranking loyalist to King Munjong. It is the first installment of the Jupiter Film's three-part film project on the Korean fortune-telling traditions and was followed by two sequels, The Princess and the Matchmaker and Feng Shui in 2018.

The Face Reader became one of the highest-grossing films in South Korea in 2013, with 9.1 million admissions. It won six awards at the 50th Grand Bell Awards, including Best Film, Best Director for Han Jae-rim, and Best Actor for Song Kang-ho. This film is Lee Jong-suk's only historical project to date.

Plot
Nae-gyeong, the most skillful face reader in the Joseon dynasty, was living in seclusion when he was offered a lucrative partnership by Yeon-hong, a gisaeng. Nae-gyeong accepts the proposal to read the faces of Yeon-hong’s guests only to get involved in a murder case. With his face reading skills, Nae-gyeong successfully identifies the murderer and his skills are soon acknowledged by King Munjong who orders him to identify the potential traitors who threaten his reign. However, after the unexpected death of Munjong, Nae-gyeong is courted by Grand Prince Suyang who yearns to become King himself by killing the young successor Danjong. Nae-gyeong decides to keep his loyalty to the late King and help Kim Jongseo protect the young King which forces him into the biggest power struggle in the history of the Joseon dynasty.

Cast

Song Kang-ho as Nae-gyeong
Lee Jung-jae as Grand Prince Suyang
Baek Yoon-sik as Kim Jongseo 
Jo Jung-suk as Paeng-heon, Nae-gyeong's brother-in-law and assistant
Lee Jong-suk as Jin-hyeong, Nae-gyeong's son
Kim Hye-soo as Yeon-hong
Kim Eui-sung as Han Myung-hoi
Jung Gyu-soo as Park Cheom-ji
Chae Sang-woo as Danjong
Lee Yoon-geon as Jo Sang-yong
Lee Do-yeob as Kim Seung-kyu
Yoo Sang-jae as Hong Yun-seong
Lee Ae-rin as Hong-dan
Lee Yong-gwan as Yang-jeong
Yoon Kyung-ho as Im-woon
Seo Hyun-woo as Jin-moo
Lee Chang-jik as Hwangbo In
Kim Tae-woo as King Munjong
Ko Chang-seok as His Excellency Choi
Kim Kang-hyeon as Suspect 3

Production
Kim Dong-hyuk's screenplay won the grand prize at the 2010 Korean Scenario Contest held by the Korean Film Council.

Awards and nominations

References

External links
 

2013 films
2010s Korean-language films
Films set in the Joseon dynasty
Films set in the 1450s
South Korean historical films
Films directed by Han Jae-rim
Showbox films
2010s South Korean films